The Beauséjour River is a river in Grenada.

See also
List of rivers of Grenada

References
 GEOnet Names Server 
Grenada map

Rivers of Grenada